Boneh Dar (also Romanized as Boneh Dār; also known as Banī Dar, Beni Dar, Boney Darreh, and Bonīdar) is a village in Negel Rural District, Kalatrazan District, Sanandaj County, Kurdistan Province, Iran. At the 2006 census, its population was 175, in 40 families. The village is populated by Kurds.

References 

Towns and villages in Sanandaj County
Kurdish settlements in Kurdistan Province